is a former Japanese Brazilian (Nisei) football player and manager. In January 1985, he obtained his Japanese citizenship, and played for Japan national team.

Club career
Yonashiro was born in São Paulo, Brazil on November 28, 1950. He joined Japan Soccer League Division 2 club Yomiuri in 1972. The club was promoted to Division 1 in 1978. In 1979, the club won first title JSL Cup. The club won the league champions in 1983, 1984. The club also won 1984 Emperor's Cup and 1985 JSL Cup. He retired in 1986. He played 239 games and scored 93 goals in the league. He was selected Best Eleven 5 times.

National team career
In January 1985, Yonashiro was approved for naturalisation as a Japanese citizen by the Ministry of Justice. In October, when he was 34 years old, he was selected to the Japan national team for the 1986 World Cup qualification. At this competition, on October 26, he debuted against South Korea. He played 2 games for Japan in 1985.

Coaching career
After retirement, Yonashiro became a manager for Yomiuri in 1986. He led the club to won 1986–87 Japan Soccer League. The club also won 1986 and 1987 Emperor's Cup. In Asia, the club won 1987 Asian Club Championship. He resigned in 1990. In September 1994, he became a manager for Kyoto Purple Sanga as Seishiro Shimatani successor. In June 1996, he became a manager for Kyoto Purple Sanga again as Oscar successor. In 2004, he signed with Prefectural Leagues club FC Ryukyu. He promoted the club to Regional Leagues in 2005 and Japan Football League in 2006. In 2007, he moved to Regional Leagues club Giravanz Kitakyushu. He promoted the club to Japan Football League in 2008 and J2 League in 2010. He resigned end of 2010 season. In 2013, he signed with Japan Football League club Blaublitz Akita. He promoted the club to new league J3 League in 2014. He resigned end of 2014 season.

Club statistics

National team statistics

Managerial statistics

References

External links

Japan National Football Team Database

Profile at Akita

1950 births
Living people
Japanese footballers
Brazilian footballers
Japan international footballers
Japan Soccer League players
Tokyo Verdy players
Japanese football managers
J1 League managers
J2 League managers
J3 League managers
Kyoto Sanga FC managers
FC Ryukyu managers
Giravanz Kitakyushu managers
Blaublitz Akita managers
Brazilian people of Japanese descent
Brazilian emigrants to Japan
Naturalized citizens of Japan
Association football midfielders
Footballers from São Paulo